James Tyrus Seidule (born 1962), known as Ty Seidule, is a retired United States Army brigadier general, the former head of the history department at the United States Military Academy, the first professor emeritus of history at West Point, and the inaugural Joshua Chamberlain Fellow at Hamilton College. Seidule is also the Presidential Advisor to The National WWII Museum in New Orleans and a fellow at New America. In February 2021, Defense Secretary Lloyd Austin appointed Seidule as one of four representatives of the US Department of Defense to the Commission on the Naming of Items of the Department of Defense that Commemorate the Confederate States of America or Any Person Who Served Voluntarily with the Confederate States of America, including US Army installations named for Confederate soldiers.

Early life and later career 
Ty Seidule was born in Alexandria, Virginia, on July 3, 1962. He was raised just blocks away from the home of Confederate States Army commander Robert E. Lee, a fact that would later play a prominent role in his academic career. He also attended Robert E. Lee Elementary School (which was later became the Nannie J. Lee Memorial Recreation Center, named after a prominent African-American resident, after the school was closed in 1978 and the property transferred to the city parks department) in Alexandria, and later earned a Bachelor of Arts degree from Washington and Lee University in 1984. He later obtained a MA in 1994 and PhD in 1997 in history from Ohio State University. While still teaching at the military academy, Seidule continued to work on his doctoral degree in Ohio State graduate program under the direction of professor Allan R. Millett.

Upon completion of the college ROTC program at Washington and Lee University in 1984, Seidule became an officer in the United States Army. Seidule served for 36 years, starting as a tank platoon leader in Germany. His commands include a cavalry unit in the 82nd Airborne Division during the Gulf War, as well as 3rd Battalion, 81st Armor Regiment. His staff positions included crisis planning for NATO in Kosovo and North Macedonia.

After receiving his master's degree in history from Ohio State University in 1994, Seidule was appointed an assistant professor of history at the United States Military Academy while remaining on active duty in the army. Seidule retired from the military academy and the US Army as a brigadier general in 2020.

In 2020, Seidule was appointed the Chamberlain Fellow and visiting professor of history at Hamilton College. He is also a fellow in the International Security program at New America. He is a professor emeritus of history at the United States Military Academy at West Point, where he taught and was the head of the history department for two decades during his time as an officer in the US Army.

In May 2021, Seidule was awarded an honorary doctorate and was the commencement speaker at Hamilton College.

Publications 
 
 
 The West Point History of Warfare, editors Clifford J. Rogers and Ty Seidule, four volumes, 71-chapter enhanced e-book (New York: Rowan Technology Solutions, 2015).

References

1962 births
Living people
Military personnel from Alexandria, Virginia
Writers from Alexandria, Virginia
United States Army generals
United States Army personnel of the Gulf War
United States Military Academy faculty
Hamilton College (New York) faculty
Washington and Lee University alumni
Ohio State University alumni
21st-century American historians
21st-century American non-fiction writers
American male non-fiction writers
Historians of the American Civil War
American military historians
21st-century American male writers
Historians from Virginia